Neoverrucidae is a family of crustaceans belonging to the order Scalpellomorpha.

Genera:
 Imbricaverruca Newman, 2000
 Neoverruca Newman, 1989

References

Barnacles
Crustacean families